Cufeu is a village in the Oio Region of northern Guinea-Bissau. It is located west of Alabato.

References

External links
Maplandia World Gazetteer

Populated places in Guinea-Bissau
Oio Region